Nauert is a surname. Notable people with the surname include:

 Heather Nauert (born 1970), American journalist and diplomat
 Paul Nauert (born 1963), American baseball player
 Randy Nauert (1945–2019), American record producer

See also
 Naert
 Nauer